Adam Hakeem  is a Singaporean professional footballer currently playing as a defender for Singapore Premier League side Geylang International.

He is the eldest son of Singapore football legend Nazri Nasir and Sharifah Almaghbouly.

Career statistics 
As @ 10 Oct 2021

References

1997 births
Living people
Singaporean footballers
Association football midfielders
Singapore Premier League players
Young Lions FC players